Sandro Bloudek (born 16 February 1986) is a Slovenian professional footballer who plays as a midfielder for Bistrica.

Club career
In 2004, Milan signed Bloudek from Maribor. He played with the youth team and appeared as an unused substitute for the first team in the last two matches of 2004–05 Serie A season. After that he was loaned out to a series of Italian clubs before ending up with Croatian team Varteks, to which he moved on a permanent basis in 2009. After this he was signed by Šibenik, before moving to Belgian team Oud-Heverlee Leuven. With OH Leuven he enjoyed promotion from the Belgian Second Division to the Belgian Pro League, however, soon after the promotion he was released.

References

External links

1986 births
Living people
Sportspeople from Zenica
Bosnia and Herzegovina emigrants to Slovenia
Slovenian footballers
Association football midfielders
Slovenia youth international footballers
Slovenian PrvaLiga players
Croatian Football League players
Challenger Pro League players
Eerste Divisie players
NK Železničar Maribor players
A.C. Milan players
U.S. Pistoiese 1921 players
U.S. Cremonese players
FC Chiasso players
NK Varaždin players
HNK Šibenik players
Oud-Heverlee Leuven players
Fortuna Sittard players
NK Široki Brijeg players
NK Aluminij players
Slovenian expatriate footballers
Slovenian expatriate sportspeople in Belgium
Expatriate footballers in Belgium
Slovenian expatriate sportspeople in the Netherlands
Expatriate footballers in the Netherlands
Slovenian expatriate sportspeople in Austria
Expatriate footballers in Austria
Slovenian expatriate sportspeople in Italy
Expatriate footballers in Italy
Slovenian expatriate sportspeople in Switzerland
Expatriate footballers in Switzerland
Slovenian expatriate sportspeople in Croatia
Expatriate footballers in Croatia